San Ignacio, Misiones may refer to: 

San Ignacio, Argentina, a city in the province of Misiones
San Ignacio, Paraguay, a city in the department of Misiones